Robert Jones VC (19 August 1857 – 6 September 1898) was a Welsh recipient of the Victoria Cross for his actions at the Battle of Rorke's Drift in January 1879, the highest and most prestigious award for gallantry in the face of the enemy that can be awarded to British and Commonwealth forces. 

Jones was born at Penrhos, a hamlet to the north of Raglan in Monmouthshire, Wales.

Military achievements
Jones was 21 years old, serving as a private in the 2nd Battalion, 24th Regiment of Foot (later The South Wales Borderers), British Army din the Anglo-Zulu War. At Rorke's Drift he and Pte. 593 William Jones were posted in a room of the hospital facing the hill.

The two men kept up a steady fire against enormous odds. Then, while one worked to cut a hole through the partition into the next room, the other shot Zulu after Zulu through the loopholed walls, using his own and his comrade's rifle alternately as the barrels became too hot to hold from the incessant firing.

By their combined efforts the two men carried six patients to safety through the broken partition. A seventh, Sgt. Maxfield, was delirious and refused to be helped. When Robert Jones returned to take Maxfield to safety by force, he found him in his bed being stabbed by Zulus. Robert Jones suffered four assegai spear wounds, was struck by a bullet, and had minor burns.

After the battle, General Sir Garnet Wolseley awarded Robert and William Jones the VC at Utrecht, Transvaal.

Later life

After leaving the army, Jones settled in Herefordshire where he became a farm labourer. He married Elizabeth Hopkins. They had five children: Robert Jones, jr, Edith Emily East (née Jones), Alice Smith (née Jones) Lily Rose Griffiths (née Jones) and Ellen Kelly (née Jones) called Nellie by the family.

In 1898 Jones died in Peterchurch, Herefordshire, from gunshot wounds to the head at the age of 41. He had borrowed his employer's shotgun to go crow-shooting. His death certificate records a verdict of suicide whilst being insane. The coroner heard that he was plagued by recurring nightmares arising from his desperate hand-to-hand combat with Zulus. Jones was buried at St Peter's Church. Instead of being carried through the church gates into the graveyard, his coffin was taken over the wall due to the stigma of the time in regards to suicide. Jones' headstone was situated facing away from the church and his grave remains the only one in the churchyard to do so.

Jones' widow, Elizabeth, gave damning evidence at his inquest. She later married a William Tilbury, by whom she had two further children.

Victoria Cross
Jones' Victoria Cross passed out of the family. In 1996 Lord Ashcroft bought it at auction for £80,000. It is on display in the Lord Ashcroft Gallery at the Imperial War Museum, London.

Ashcroft outbid both the South Wales Borderers' regimental museum and members of Jones' family. Members of the family had approached the regimental museum but had been told the museum were not in a position to bid. But the museum did bid for the medal, and without realising it, family members who wanted to buy the Victoria Cross and donate it to the regimental museum unwittingly ended up bidding against the museum.

Film
In the 1964 film Zulu, actor Denys Graham played Jones.

References

 

1857 births
1898 deaths
Anglo-Zulu War recipients of the Victoria Cross
British Army personnel of the Anglo-Zulu War
British Army recipients of the Victoria Cross
British military personnel who committed suicide
British recipients of the Victoria Cross
People from Abergavenny
South Wales Borderers soldiers
Suicides by firearm in England
Welsh recipients of the Victoria Cross
Military personnel from Monmouthshire